Aires Bonifácio Baptista Ali (born 6 December 1955) is a Mozambican politician who was Prime Minister of Mozambique from 16 January 2010 to 8 October 2012, when he was sacked by Mozambican President Armando Guebuza in a cabinet reshuffle.

He was Governor of Inhambane Province from 2000 to 2004 and Minister of Education from 2005 to 2010. He was appointed ambassador to China in June 2016 by President Filipe Nyusi.

Notes

1955 births
FRELIMO politicians
Education ministers of Mozambique
Culture ministers of Mozambique
Living people
Ambassadors of Mozambique to China
People named in the Pandora Papers